William Legge, 10th Earl of Dartmouth  (born 23 September 1949), styled Viscount Lewisham from 1962 to 1997, is a British politician and hereditary peer, usually known as William Dartmouth.

From 2009 to 2019, Dartmouth sat in the European Parliament as a Member of the European Parliament (MEP) for South West England. He was elected for the UK Independence Party (UKIP) and served as national spokesman on trade from 2010 to 2018. He resigned from UKIP in 2018 due to his dissatisfaction with the direction of the party.

Early life and education
Dartmouth is the eldest son of the 9th Earl of Dartmouth and Raine McCorquodale, the daughter of romantic novelist Dame Barbara Cartland. He became a stepbrother of Lady Diana Spencer when in 1976 his mother married secondly Earl Spencer.

Dartmouth was educated at Eton and Christ Church, Oxford, where he was elected an officer of the Oxford University Conservative Association and of the Oxford Union Society. He graduated BA, later promoted to MA, and proceeded to the Harvard Business School, where he graduated MBA.

Life and career
Dartmouth qualified as a chartered accountant, which was also the occupation of his father Gerald Legge, 9th Earl of Dartmouth.

At the general election of February 1974, as Viscount Lewisham, Dartmouth unsuccessfully contested Leigh, Lancashire, for the Conservatives, and at the election of October 1974 he fought Stockport South for them.

In 1975, he became a Fellow of the Institute of Chartered Accountants. In 1997, he inherited his father’s peerages, and as Earl of Dartmouth sat as a Conservative peer in the House of Lords until 1999, when the first Blair ministry’s House of Lords Act 1999 removed all but 92 hereditary peers from Parliament. In January 2007, Dartmouth announced he was leaving the Conservatives in favour of the UK Independence Party (UKIP), citing concerns about the policies of David Cameron, then Leader of HM Opposition.

At the European Parliament election of 2009, Dartmouth was elected as the second UKIP MEP for the South West England region and re-elected in 2014, when he was the first UKIP MEP on the regional list. In the European Parliament he sat with the Europe of Freedom and Democracy group (later the Europe of Freedom and Direct Democracy) and served on the Committee on International Trade. In 2010, he became UKIP’s national spokesman on Trade and Industry and in February 2016 was appointed as one of the party's two national Deputy Chairmen. He was the author of many UKIP, EFD, and EFDD publications. On 22 January 2018, following UKIP's National Executive Committee vote of no confidence in leader Henry Bolton on the previous day, Dartmouth stood down as trade and industry spokesman, placing further pressure on Bolton to resign.

In September 2018, Dartmouth resigned from the UK Independence Party, citing concerns about the behaviour of the new Leader, Gerard Batten, and complaining that the party was “widely perceived as both homophobic and anti-Islamic”. Dartmouth condemned Batten for leading the party towards the far right and denounced his approval of and support for extreme right-wing groups and “outlandish individuals”. Dartmouth said he would not be joining another political party and would serve the rest of his term in the European Parliament as an Independent, continuing to  represent the South West of England and Gibraltar.

Family and personal life

In June 2009, Dartmouth married Melbourne-born former model Fiona Campbell, now styled Lady Dartmouth, whose first husband, Matt Handbury, is a nephew of Rupert Murdoch. They subsequently divorced.

Dartmouth has a son, Gerald Glen Kavanagh-Legge (born 2005), from his previous relationship with the television producer Claire Kavanagh.

References

External links

pedigree of William Legge, 10th Earl of Dartmouth
Debrett's People of Today
 European Parliament profile
Lord Dartmouth's website
http://www.ukipmeps.org/

1949 births
Alumni of Christ Church, Oxford
Conservative Party (UK) hereditary peers
10
Harvard Business School alumni
William
Living people
MEPs for England 2009–2014
MEPs for England 2014–2019
People educated at Eton College
UK Independence Party MEPs
British Eurosceptics
Dartmouth